Scary Terry may refer to:
Scary Terry, a character in the Rick and Morty episode "Lawnmower Dog"
Terry McLaurin, American football player nicknamed Scary Terry
Terry Rozier, American basketball player nicknamed Scary Terry